Steven Kenneth Bonnell II (born December 12, 1988), known online as Destiny, is an American internet personality and political commentator. He was among the first people to stream video games online full-time and received attention as a pioneer of the industry.
Since 2016, he has garnered further attention for live-streaming political debates with other online personalities, in which he advocates for progressive and liberal politics. Since 2022, he has become a vocal opponent of Red Pill politics and the Manosphere movement.

Early life 
Steven Kenneth Bonnell II was born in Omaha, Nebraska, on December 12, 1988, to a Cuban-American mother and a White-American father. He was raised in a conservative Catholic home, and he attended Creighton Preparatory School, a private Jesuit high school for boys. When he was a pre-teen, his mother's home day care business collapsed, and his family's home was foreclosed. A few years later his parents moved to take care of an aging relative, after which he lived with his grandmother until he was 18.

In 2007, Bonnell enrolled at the University of Nebraska, Omaha, where he studied music while working night shifts as a restaurant manager at a casino. Ultimately unable to juggle both his education and full-time work, Bonnell dropped out of college in 2010. Soon after, he was fired from his restaurant position, and found work as a carpet cleaner.

Career 

In 2011, Bonnell quit his job as a carpet cleaner to stream video games full-time. Streaming his Starcraft II matches on livestream.com and ustream.tv, then Justin.tv (now Twitch), he was immediately financially successful. In October of that year, Bonnell joined professional team Quantic Gaming and placed 4th in the 2011 MLG Global North American invitational.
During his years as a Starcraft II streamer, Bonnell was known for his abrasive and confrontational style, including use of  "acerbic and often offensive" comments against other players for shock humor. Bonnell identified as a libertarian during this era, but his politics began shifting toward liberalism after an incident in which he heard another streamer call a gay person a "fucking faggot".

Starting in 2016, Bonnell has gained attention for live-streaming political debates with other internet personalities. Subsequent journalistic and academic coverage of right-wing YouTube commentary has credited Bonnell as an early and effective opposition to it, particularly owing to his provocative, combative debate style which appeals to right-wing gaming audiences. Bonnell himself has stated that his intention is not to persuade their opponents, but to persuade the audience; although he has expressed that airing his opinions often feels "like screaming into the void", he estimates he has received hundreds of emails from former members of the alt-right crediting him for their conversion to left-wing politics. In 2019, Bonnell began debating in favor of capitalism against socialists and communists.

Bonnell debated popular YouTuber Jon Jafari, better known as JonTron, on immigration and assimilation in March 2017, after Jafari tweeted in support of anti-immigration statements by Republican congressman Steve King. In his debate with Bonnell, Jafari's statements concerning race, crime, and immigration were seen as controversial by viewers, and the subsequent backlash garnered media attention.

In November 2018, Bonnell and fellow streamer Trihex (Mychal Ramon Jefferson) premiered a political commentary collaboration, The DT Podcast. The podcast streamed its final episode in October 2019, during which Jefferson confronted Bonnell regarding statements the latter had made defending his use of offensive humor—including racial slurs—in private.

Bonnell was notified in September 2020 that his Twitch partnership agreement would be terminated the following month for "encouragement of violence". The termination came as a result of comments made on-stream after the Kenosha unrest shooting, in which Bonnell expressed opposition to riots at the George Floyd protests. Bonnell said that "the rioting needs to fucking stop, and if that means like white redneck fucking militia dudes out there mowing down dipshit protesters that think that they can torch buildings at ten p.m., then at this point they have my fucking blessing..." Bonnell later clarified this point, saying Kyle Rittenhouse was clearly misguided but that Bonnell's frustration was with rioters who Bonnell believed would scare people into voting for Donald Trump again.

In March 2022, Bonnell was indefinitely banned from Twitch due to "hateful conduct". According to Dot Esports, this may have been due to Bonnell streaming with white nationalist Nick Fuentes, who had previously been banned from the platform. Bonnell speculated that the ban reason may have been linked to his expressing the view that "transwomen shouldn't compete with ciswomen in women's athletics".

Political views and activism 
Bonnell describes himself as an "Omniliberal", a phrase he uses to describe a person who believes in the core principles of liberalism, freedom and equality, whilst believing in elements of other ideologies in a "pragmatic way". Bonnell has also described himself as "a very big social democrat". He has argued against both far-right politics and far-left politics. In 2021, Bonnell debated Marxian economist Richard D. Wolff, with Bonnell defending capitalism. Bonnell described the label of "socialism" as poorly-defined, and noted a history of famine and abuses in countries like the Soviet Union and China, while Dr. Wolff called Bonnell's understanding of socialism "a laughable caricature of anything I have ever written or anything I understand is part of this conversation.". He has cited his poverty during his teenage and college-aged years as an influence on his views, and says that he prefers to argue based on empirical data rather than moral suasion.

In 2020, Bonnell supported the general election campaign of Joe Biden. Following Biden's victory, Bonnell led a canvassing campaign in support of Democratic candidates Jon Ossoff and Raphael Warnock in the 2020–21 Georgia Senate runoffs. With the help of approximately 140 volunteers mobilized from Bonnell's online audience, the campaign knocked on an estimated 17,500–20,000 doors in Columbus, Georgia, making it one of the larger campaigns of the election.

Bonnell led another canvassing operation in support of Mark Gudgel for the 2021 Omaha mayoral election. On March 3, 2021, Gudgel officially cut ties with Bonnell over the latter's statements regarding riots at the George Floyd protests.

Personal life 

Bonnell is of Cuban-American descent on his mother's side, and his son (via an ex-partner) lives in Nebraska. Bonnell moved to Glendale, California, in December 2018, then to Culver City and again to Huntington Beach. He currently resides in Miami, Florida.

He is openly bisexual and currently in an open marriage with Swedish streamer Melina Göransson. Bonnell and Göransson married in December 2021.

Having studied music in college at the University of Nebraska, Omaha, he plays multiple instruments, including the keyboard, saxophone and guitar.

References

External links 

 

1988 births
American YouTubers
American agnostics
American atheists
American people of Cuban descent
Former Roman Catholics
Liberalism in the United States
Living people
Nebraska Democrats
People from Omaha, Nebraska
StarCraft players
Twitch (service) streamers
University of Nebraska alumni
Utilitarians
American political commentators
Hispanic and Latino American people
LGBT YouTubers
Florida Democrats